The Chastelhorn is a 2,973 metres high mountain in the Lepontine Alps, overlooking Hospental in the canton of Uri. The northern flanks are covered by a glacier named St. Annafirn and a small lake (2,624 metres) lies south of the summit.

The massif of the Chastelhorn consists of several summits including the Gemsstock (2,961 metres) which is connected to Andermatt by a cable car.

References

Mountains of the Alps
Alpine three-thousanders
Mountains of Switzerland
Mountains of the canton of Uri
Lepontine Alps